Keigo (written: 敬吾, 敬悟, 奎吾, 圭吾, 桂吾, 桂悟, 啓吾, 啓悟 or 慶悟) is a masculine Japanese given name. Notable people with the name include:

, Japanese karateka
, Japanese footballer
, Japanese writer
, Japanese politician
, Japanese sumo wrestler
, Japanese politician
, Japanese footballer
Keigo Ōuchi (大内啓伍, 1930–2016), Japanese politician
, Japanese Zen Buddhist monk and diplomat
, Japanese folklorist
, Japanese swimmer
, Japanese badminton player
, Japanese Go player
Keigo Sato (佐藤 景瑚, born 1998), Japanese idol, member of JO1

Fictional characters 

 Keigo Takami (鷹見啓悟), also known as Hawks, a character from the manga and anime My Hero Academia
 Keigo Kazama, a character from the game and anime Dream Festival!

See also 
 
 
 

Japanese masculine given names